Convolvulus fernandesii is a species of plant in the family Convolvulaceae. It is endemic to the Arrábida Natural Park, Portugal.

References

fernandesii
Endemic flora of Portugal
Endemic flora of the Iberian Peninsula